, usually shortened to as  or abbreviated to as , is a bus operator that provides scheduled local services in Nara Prefecture, the southern part of Kyoto Prefecture, the southeastern part of Wakayama Prefecture, and the central part of Osaka Prefecture in Japan.

The operator also provides scheduled sightseeing bus services within Nara, airport bus services to and from Osaka Kansai International Airport and Itami Airport, and intercity bus services to and from Chiba, Nagoya, Tokyo, and Yokohama. Charter, tour, and contract bus services are also provided by the operator.

History
The history of Nara Kotsu Bus Lines' traces its origin back to 1929 when  was founded in Nara City. The bus operator eventually has become the surviving entity and a sole operator in the prefecture since it merged with Fugen Nanwa Omnibus, Omine Auto, Yoshino Auto, and Yoshino-Uda Transit on July 1, 1943.

External links

Bus companies of Japan
Transport in Nara Prefecture
Transport companies established in 1929
Japanese companies established in 1929